Chua Phung Kim (29 April 1939 – 4 August 1990) was a Singaporean weightlifter. He was a gold medalist in weightlifting in the 1962 British Empire and Commonwealth Games.

Weightlifting career 
Chua first took to the sport in 1960 after being introduced to it by his elder brother, Chua Peng Kim. 

Chua won the silver medal at the 1961 Southeast Asian Peninsular Games (SEAP Games). 

Just two years later, he helped Singapore win another gold medal in the Commonwealth Games by coming in tops in the bantamweight category during the 1962 British Empire and Commonwealth Games held in Perth, Western Australia after lifting a total of 710 lbs, a Commonwealth Games record. He also broke the individual records for the press (215 lbs), snatch (225 lbs) and jerk (270 lbs). 

He represented Malaysia at the 1964 Summer Olympics in Tokyo when Singapore was part of Malaysia, but only managed the sixth position.

In 1965, Chua also took the gold medal in the 4th SEAP Games held in Kuala Lumpur, Malaysia.

Chua won the silver medal in the bantamweight category at the 1966 Asian Games in Bangkok, Thailand.

Chua was awarded a Certificate of merit during the inaugural Singapore Sports Awards in 1968.

In 1966, Chua took part in the 1966 British Empire and Commonwealth Games in the bantamweight category. He failed all his lifts and did not register a total.

During the 1970 British Commonwealth Games, Chua won the silver medal in the Featherweight category, losing out on the gold medal by 2.5 kilograms. 

In March 1971, Chua retired from competitive participation in the sport. In 1976, he contributed to the sport as a coach under the Singapore Amateur Weightlifting Federation.

Personal life 
Chua worked as an auto mechanic and later as a mechanical supervisor with the Singapore Refining Company. He died in 1990 after a long sickness.

References

External links
 
 

1939 births
1990 deaths
Singaporean sportspeople of Chinese descent
Singaporean male weightlifters
Olympic weightlifters of Malaysia
Olympic weightlifters of Singapore
Weightlifters at the 1964 Summer Olympics
Weightlifters at the 1968 Summer Olympics
Commonwealth Games gold medallists for Singapore
Commonwealth Games silver medallists for Singapore
Weightlifters at the 1962 British Empire and Commonwealth Games
Weightlifters at the 1966 British Empire and Commonwealth Games
Weightlifters at the 1970 British Commonwealth Games
Asian Games medalists in weightlifting
Weightlifters at the 1958 Asian Games
Weightlifters at the 1966 Asian Games
Commonwealth Games medallists in weightlifting
Asian Games silver medalists for Singapore
Medalists at the 1966 Asian Games
Medallists at the 1962 British Empire and Commonwealth Games
Medallists at the 1970 British Commonwealth Games